La voix du bon Dieu (meaning The Good Lord's Voice) is the debut studio album by Canadian singer Celine Dion, released on 6 November 1981 by Super Étoiles. It is a French-language album issued in Quebec, Canada only. It was preceded by the lead single, "Ce n'était qu'un rêve". The album was produced by René Angélil, Eddy Marnay and Daniel Hétu. It includes six original songs and three covers: Renée Lebas' "Tire l'aiguille", Berthe Sylva's "Les roses blanches" and "L'amour viendra", a French adaptation of Dario Baldan Bembo's "Dolce fiore".

Content
Dion collaborated on this project and all her next early French recordings with Eddy Marnay who wrote songs for Barbra Streisand, Édith Piaf, Nana Mouskouri and Claude François, among others. The album contains Dion's first three singles: "Ce n'était qu'un rêve" (co-written by herself), "La voix du bon Dieu" and "L'amour viendra" (French adaptation of Dario Baldan Bembo's song "Dolce fiore"), as well as two covers: Renée Lebas' "Tire l'aiguille" and Berthe Sylva's "Les roses blanches".

Commercial performance
René Angélil, Dion's manager (later husband) mortgaged his home to start his own record company just to produce her first records. He decided to put out two albums at the same time: La voix du bon Dieu and Céline Dion chante Noël. They sold 30,000 copies in 1981 and would go on to sell about 125,000 copies the following year. La voix du bon Dieu has sold 100,000 copies in total. The album produced two top twenty Quebec singles in "Ce n'était qu'un rêve" and "La voix du bon Dieu" which peaked at number fourteen and eleven, respectively. "Ce n'était qu'un rêve" was also released in France in 1982 as Dion's first single in that country. In 2005, Dion included "Ce n'était qu'un rêve" and "La voix du bon Dieu" on her greatest hits compilation, On ne change pas.

Accolades

In 1982, Dion was nominated for the Félix Award for Newcomer of the Year.

Track listing

Release history

References

External links
 

1981 debut albums
Albums produced by Eddy Marnay
Celine Dion albums
Albums produced by René Angélil